The Testament is the sixth studio album by Swedish progressive metal band Seventh Wonder, released on 10 June 2022. It is the band's first studio album in almost four years since Tiara (2018), marking the longest gap between two studio albums in the band's career without a recording hiatus.

Track listing 
 "Warriors" – 4:42
 "The Light" – 6:13
 "I Carry the Blame" – 6:06
 "Reflections" – 5:35
 "The Red River" – 6:12
 "Invincible" – 3:39
 "Mindkiller" – 5:58
 "Under a Clear Blue Sky" – 8:45
 "Elegy" – 5:51

Personnel 
Seventh Wonder
Tommy Karevik – vocals
Andreas Söderin – keyboard
Johan Liefvendahl – guitar
Andreas Blomqvist – bass
Stefan Norgren – drums

Charts

References 

2022 albums
Seventh Wonder albums